Fun Kids is a national children's and pop digital radio station in the United Kingdom with associated websites, YouTube and podcast channels. It has previously been the winner of the Sony and Arqiva Digital Radio Stations of the year. It is operated by Children's Radio UK Ltd. It broadcasts on DAB Digital Radio across the UK as well as online and mobile.

Background
Fun Kids (formerly Fun Radio) was created by the now-defunct GCap Media, Hit Entertainment and the children's radio campaigner Susan Stranks.
It went on-air in May 2005 and then was acquired in September 2008 by Folder Media.

Fun Radio was initially launched on DAB digital radio in London and some areas of the South East alongside being broadcast on digital television. In January 2008, the line ups of a number of local digital multiplexes changed, with Fun Radio being removed as a service from those outside London.

Broadcasting Nationwide 
In the summer of 2009, Fun Kids launched temporarily on the national Digital One multiplex from 27 June until 3 October. Fun Kids was removed from Virgin Media channel 926 on 1 December 2009 and also from Sky channel 0171 on 16 December 2009.

In February 2016 it was announced that the station would start broadcasting nationwide by joining Sound Digital's national DAB digital radio multiplex. It launched, alongside the multiplex's other radio stations on 29 February.

Presenters

Fun Kids has been a training ground for many young radio presenters including James Barr, Tim Dixon, James Beckingham, Frankie Vu, Matt Kot, Luke Franks, Anna Louise-Walter and Sean Thorne.

Its current presenter line-up includes: George Butler, Dan Simpson, Bex Lindsay, Conor Knight, Robyn Richford, Emma-Louise Amanshia and Georgia Kain.

Fun Kids Junior 
On 22 July 2019, Fun Kids launched Fun Kids Junior, its sister radio station for preschool children and parents. The station plays songs for preschool children to sing and dance to during the day and bedtime stories and lullabies during the evening and overnight.

Fun Kids Junior is currently available on DAB+ Digital Radio in London, South East, Liverpool and Cheshire. It also broadcasts on the Fun Kids website, on the Fun Kids app and on smart speakers, for example, saying "Alexa, play Fun Kids Junior!" turns on the station.

Other stations 
In January 2020, Fun Kids launched eight new stations - Fun Kids Animals, Fun Kids Classics, Fun Kids Classical, Fun Kids Party, Fun Kids Pop Hits, Fun Kids Naps, Fun Kids Silly and Fun Kids Soundtracks. Its classical music station, Fun Kids Classical, has concert pianist Lang Lang as its ambassador.

External links

References 

Radio stations in London
Digital-only radio stations
Children's radio stations in the United Kingdom
Children's websites